Aircraft engines produce gases, noise, and particulates from fossil fuel combustion, raising environmental concerns over their global effects and their effects on local air quality.

Jet airliners contribute to climate change by emitting carbon dioxide, the best understood greenhouse gas, and, with less scientific understanding, nitrogen oxides, contrails and particulates.
Their radiative forcing is estimated at 1.3–1.4 that of  alone, excluding induced cirrus cloud with a very low level of scientific understanding.
In 2018, global commercial operations generated 2.4% of all  emissions.

Jet airliners have become 70% more fuel efficient between 1967 and 2007, and  emissions per revenue ton-kilometer (RTK) in 2018 were 47% of those in 1990.

While the aviation industry is more fuel efficient, overall emissions have risen as the volume of air travel has increased. By 2020, aviation emissions were 70% higher than in 2005 and they could grow by 300% by 2050.

Aircraft noise pollution disrupts sleep, children's education and could increase cardiovascular risk.

Airports can generate water pollution due to their extensive handling of jet fuel and deicing chemicals if not contained, contaminating nearby water bodies.

Aviation activities emit ozone and ultrafine particles, both of which are health hazards. Piston engines used in general aviation burn Avgas, releasing toxic lead.

Aviation biofuel, emissions trading and carbon offsetting, part of the ICAO's CORSIA, can lower  emissions. Aviation usage can be lowered by short-haul flight bans, train connections, personal choices and aviation taxation and subsidies. Fuel-powered aircraft may be replaced by hybrid electric aircraft and electric aircraft or by hydrogen-powered aircraft.
Since 2021, the IATA members plan net-zero carbon emissions by 2050, followed by the ICAO in 2022.

Climate change

Factors 

Airplanes emit gases (carbon dioxide, water vapor, nitrogen oxides or carbon monoxide − bonding with oxygen to become  upon release) and atmospheric particulates (incompletely burned hydrocarbons, sulfur oxides, black carbon), interacting among themselves and with the atmosphere.

 Carbon dioxide
  emissions are the most significant and best understood contribution to climate change. The effects of  emissions are similar regardless of altitude. Airport ground vehicles, those used by passengers and staff to access airports, emissions generated by airport construction and aircraft manufacturing also contribute to the greenhouse gas emissions from the aviation industry.

 Nitrogen oxides (nitric oxide and nitrogen dioxide)
 In the tropopause, emissions of  favor ozone formation in the upper troposphere. The effect of  surface concentrations are regional and local, but it becomes well mixed globally at mid and upper tropospheric levels.  emissions also reduce ambient levels of methane, another greenhouse gas, resulting in a climate cooling effect, though not offsetting the  forming effect. Aircraft sulfur and water emissions in the stratosphere tend to deplete , partially offsetting the -induced  increases, although these effects have not been quantified. Light aircraft and small commuter aircraft fly lower in the troposphere, not in the tropopause.

 Contrails and cirrus clouds
 Fuel burning produces water vapor, which condenses at high altitude, under cold and humid conditions, into visible line clouds: condensation trails (contrails). They are thought to have a global warming effect, though less significant than  emissions. Contrails are uncommon from lower-altitude aircraft. Cirrus clouds can develop after the formation of persistent contrails and can have an additional global warming effect. Their global warming contribution is uncertain and estimating aviation's overall contribution often excludes cirrus cloud enhancement.

 Particulates
 Compared with other emissions, sulfate and soot particles have a smaller direct effect: sulfate particles have a cooling effect and reflect radiation, while soot has a warming effect and absorbs heat, while the clouds' properties and formation are influenced by particles. Contrails and cirrus clouds evolving from particles may have a greater radiative forcing effect than  emissions. As soot particles are large enough to serve as condensation nuclei, they are thought to cause the most contrail formation. Soot production may be decreased by reducing the aromatic compound of jet fuel.

In 1999, the IPCC estimated aviation's radiative forcing in 1992 to be 2.7 (2 to 4) times that of  alone − excluding the potential effect of cirrus cloud enhancement. 
This was updated for 2000, with aviation's radiative forcing estimated at 47.8 mW/m2,  times the effect of  emissions alone, 25.3 mW/m2.

In 2005, research by David S. Lee, et al, published in the scientific journal Atmospheric Environment estimated the cumulative radiative forcing effect of aviation at 55 mW/m2, which is twice the 28 mW/m2 radiative forcing effect of its  emissions alone, excluding induced cirrus cloud, with a very low level of scientific understanding.
In 2012, research from Chalmers university estimated this weighting factor at 1.3–1.4 if aviation induced cirrus is not included, 1.7–1.8 if they are included (within a range of 1.3–2.9).

Uncertainties remain on the NOx–O3–CH4 interactions, aviation-produced contrails formation, the effects of soot aerosols on cirrus clouds and measuring non-CO2 radiative forcing.

In 2018,  represented 34.3 mW/m2 of aviation's effective radiative forcing (ERF, on the surface), with a high confidence level (± 6 mW/m2),  17.5 mW/m2 with a low confidence level (± 14) and contrail cirrus 57.4 mW/m2, also with a low confidence level (± 40).
All factors combined represented 43.5 mW/m2 ( that of  alone) excluding contrail cirrus and 101 mW/m2 (±45) including them, 3.5% of the anthropogenic ERF of 2290 mW/m2 (± 1100).

Volume 

The traffic was experiencing continuous growth, doubling every 15 years, despite external shocks − a 4.3% average yearly growth and Airbus forecasts expect the growth to continue.
While the aviation industry is more fuel efficient, halving the amount of fuel burned per flight compared to 1990 through technological advancement and operations improvements, overall emissions have risen as the volume of air travel has increased.
Between 1960 and 2018, RPKs increased from 109 to 8,269 billion.

In 1992, aircraft emissions represented 2% of all man-made  emissions, having accumulated a little more than 1% of the total man-made  increase over 50 years.
By 2015, aviation accounted for 2.5% of global  emissions.
Emissions from flights rose by 32% between 2013 and 2018.

Between 1990 and 2006, greenhouse gas emissions from aviation increased by 87% in the European Union.

In 2010, about 60% of aviation emissions came from international flights, which are outside the emission reduction targets of the Kyoto Protocol. International flights are not covered by the Paris Agreement, either, to avoid a patchwork of individual country regulations. That agreement was adopted by the International Civil Aviation Organization, however, capping airlines carbon emissions to the year 2020 level, while allowing airlines to buy carbon credits from other industries and projects.

In 1992, aircraft radiative forcing was estimated by the IPCC at 3.5% of the total man-made radiative forcing.

Per passenger 

As it accounts for a large share of their costs, 28% by 2007, airlines have a strong incentive to lower their fuel consumption, reducing their environmental footprint.
Jet airliners have become 70% more fuel efficient between 1967 and 2007.
Jetliner fuel efficiency improves continuously, 40% of the improvement come from engines and 30% from airframes.
Efficiency gains were larger early in the jet age than later, with a 55–67% gain from 1960 to 1980 and a 20–26% gain from 1980 to 2000.

The average fuel burn of new aircraft fell 45% from 1968 to 2014, a compounded annual reduction of 1.3% with variable reduction rate.
By 2018,  emissions per revenue ton-kilometer (RTK) were more than halved compared to 1990, at 47%. 
The aviation energy intensity went from 21.2 to 12.3 MJ/RTK between 2000 and 2019, a % reduction.

The ICAO targets a 2% efficiency improvement per year between 2013 and 2050, while the IATA targets 1.5% for 2009–2020 and to cut net  emissions in half by 2050 relative to 2005.

Evolution 

In 1999, the IPCC estimated aviation's radiative forcing may represent 190 mW/m2 or 5% of the total man-made radiative forcing in 2050, with the uncertainty ranging from 100 to 500 mW/m2. If other industries achieve significant reductions in greenhouse gas emissions over time, aviation's share, as a proportion of the remaining emissions, could rise.

Alice Bows-Larkin estimated that the annual global  emissions budget would be entirely consumed by aviation emissions to keep the climate change temperature increase below 2 °C by mid-century. Given that growth projections indicate that aviation will generate 15% of global  emissions, even with the most advanced technology forecast, she estimated that to hold the risks of dangerous climate change to under 50% by 2050 would exceed the entire carbon budget in conventional scenarios.

In 2013, the National Center for Atmospheric Science at the University of Reading forecast that increasing  levels will result in a significant increase in in-flight turbulence experienced by transatlantic airline flights by the middle of the 21st century.

Aviation  emissions grow despite efficiency innovations to aircraft, powerplants and flight operations.
Air travel continue to grow.

In 2015, the Center for Biological Diversity estimated that aircraft could generate  of carbon dioxide emissions through 2050, consuming almost 5% of the remaining global carbon budget.
Many countries have pledged emissions reductions for the Paris Agreement, but the sum of these efforts and pledges remains insufficient and not addressing airplane pollution would be a failure despite technological and operational advancements.

The International Energy Agency projects aviation share of global  emissions may grow from 2.5% in 2019 to 3.5% by 2030.

By 2020, global international aviation emissions were around 70% higher than in 2005 and the ICAO forecasts they could grow by over further 300% by 2050 in the absence of additional measures.

By 2050, aviation's negative effects on climate could be decreased by a 2% increase in fuel efficiency and a decrease in  emissions, due to advanced aircraft technologies, operational procedures and renewable alternative fuels decreasing radiative forcing due to sulfate aerosol and black carbon.

Noise 

Air traffic causes aircraft noise, which disrupts sleep, adversely affects children's school performance and could increase cardiovascular risk for airport neighbours. Sleep disruption can be reduced by banning or restricting flying at night, but disturbance progressively decreases and legislation differs across countries.

The ICAO Chapter 14 noise standard applies for aeroplanes submitted for certification after 31 December 2017, and after 31 December 2020 for aircraft below , 7 EPNdB (cumulative) quieter than Chapter4. The FAA Stage 5 noise standards are equivalent. Higher bypass ratio engines produce less noise. The PW1000G is presented as 75% quieter than previous engines. Serrated edges or 'chevrons' on the back of the nacelle reduce noise.

A Continuous Descent Approach (CDA) is quieter as less noise is produced while the engines are near idle power. CDA can reduce noise on the ground by ~1–5 dB per flight.

Water pollution 

Airports can generate significant water pollution due to their extensive use and handling of jet fuel, lubricants and other chemicals. Chemical spills can be mitigated or prevented by spill containment structures and clean-up equipment such as vacuum trucks, portable berms and absorbents.

Deicing fluids used in cold weather can pollute water, as most of them fall to the ground and surface runoff can carry them to nearby streams, rivers or coastal waters. Deicing fluids are based on ethylene glycol or propylene glycol. Airports use pavement deicers on paved surfaces including runways and taxiways, which may contain potassium acetate, glycol compounds, sodium acetate, urea or other chemicals.

During degradation in surface waters, ethylene and propylene glycol exert high levels of biochemical oxygen demand, consuming oxygen needed by aquatic life. Microbial populations decomposing propylene glycol consume large quantities of dissolved oxygen (DO) in the water column.
Fish, macroinvertebrates and other aquatic organisms need sufficient dissolved oxygen levels in surface waters. Low oxygen concentrations reduce usable aquatic habitat because organisms die if they cannot move to areas with sufficient oxygen levels. Bottom feeder populations can be reduced or eliminated by low DO levels, changing a community's species profile or altering critical food-web interactions.

Glycol-based deicing fluids are toxic to humans and other mammals. Research into non-toxic alternative deicing fluids is ongoing.

Air pollution  

Aviation is the main human source of ozone, a respiratory health hazard, causing an estimated 6,800 premature deaths per year.

Aircraft engines emit ultrafine particles (UFPs) in and near airports, as does ground support equipment. During takeoff, 3 to 50 × 1015 particles were measured per kg of fuel burned, while significant differences are observed depending on the engine. Other estimates include 4 to 200 × 1015 particles for 0.1–0.7 gram, or 14 to 710 × 1015 particles, or 0.1–10 × 1015 black carbon particles for 0.046–0.941 g.

In the United States, 167,000 piston aircraft engines, representing three-quarters of private airplanes, burn Avgas, releasing lead into the air. The Environmental Protection Agency estimated this released 34,000 tons of lead into the atmosphere between 1970 and 2007. The Federal Aviation Administration recognizes inhaled or ingested lead leads to adverse effects on the nervous system, red blood cells, and cardiovascular and immune systems. Lead exposure in infants and young children may contribute to behavioral and learning problems and lower IQ.

Mitigation 

Aviation's environmental footprint can be mitigated by reducing air travel, optimizing flight routes, capping emissions, restricting short-distance flights, increasing taxation and decreasing subsidies to the aviation industry. Technological innovation could also mitigate damage to the environment and climate, for example, through the development of electric aircraft, biofuels, and increased fuel efficiency.

In 2016, the International Civil Aviation Organization (ICAO) committed to improve aviation fuel efficiency by 2% per year and to keeping the carbon emissions from 2020 onwards at the same level as those from 2010.
To achieve these goals, multiple measures were identified: more fuel-efficient aircraft technology; development and deployment of sustainable aviation fuels (SAFs); improved air traffic management (ATM); market-based measures like emission trading, levies, and carbon offsetting, the Carbon Offsetting and Reduction Scheme for International Aviation (CORSIA).

In December 2020, the UK Climate Change Committee said that: "Mitigation options considered include demand management, improvements in aircraft efficiency (including use of hybrid electric aircraft), and use of sustainable aviation fuels (biofuels, biowaste to jet and synthetic jet fuels) to displace fossil jet fuel."

In February 2021, Europe's aviation sector unveiled its Destination 2050 sustainability initiative towards zero  emissions by 2050:
 aircraft technology improvements for 37% emission reductions;
 SAFs for 34%;
 economic measures for 8%;
 ATM and operations improvements for 6%;
while air traffic should grow by 1.4% per year between 2018 and 2050.
The initiative is led by ACI Europe, ASD Europe, A4E, CANSO and ERA.
This would apply to flights within and departing the European single market  and the UK.

In October 2021, the IATA committed to net-zero carbon emissions by 2050. In 2022, the ICAO agreed to support a net-zero carbon emission target for 2050.

The aviation sector could be decarbonized by 2050 with moderate demand growth, continuous efficiency improvements, new short-haul engines, higher SAF production and CO2 removal to compensate for non-CO2 forcing.
With constant air transport demand and aircraft efficiency, decarbonizing aviation would require nearly five times the 2019 worldwide biofuel production, competing with other hard-to-decarbonize sectors, and 0.2 to 3.4 Gt of CO2 removal to compensate for non-CO2 forcing.
Carbon offsets would be preferred if carbon credits are less expensive than SAFs, but they may be unreliable, while specific routing could avoid contrails.
As of 2023, fuel represents 20-30% of the airlines’ operating costs, while SAF is 2–4 times more expensive than fossil jet fuel.
Projected cost decreases of green hydrogen and carbon capture could make synthetic fuels more affordable, and lower feedstock costs and higher conversion efficiencies would help FT and HEFA biofuels.
Policy incentives like cleaner aviation fuel tax credits and low-carbon fuel standards could induce improvements, and carbon pricing could render SAFs more competitive, accelerating their deployment and reducing their costs through learning and economies of scale.

According to a 2023 Royal Society study, reaching net zero would need replacing fossil aviation fuel with a low or zero carbon energy source, as battery technologies are unlikely to give enough specific energy.
Biofuels can be introduced quickly and with little aircraft modification, but are restricted by scale and feedstock availability, and few are low-carbon.
Producing enough renewable electricity to produce green hydrogen would be a costly challenge and would need substantial aircraft and infrastructure modification.
Synthetic fuels would need with little aircraft modification, but necessitates green hydrogen feedstock and large scale direct  air capture at high costs.
Low-carbon Ammonia would also need costly green hydrogen at scale, and would need substantial aircraft and infrastructure modifications. Since the options currently available are not ideal, further research and development is needed to fully decarbonise the sector.

Technology improvements

Electric aircraft 

Electric aircraft operations do not produce any emissions and electricity can be generated by renewable energy. Lithium-ion batteries including packaging and accessories gives a 160 Wh/kg energy density while aviation fuel gives 12,500 Wh/kg. As electric machines and converters are more efficient, their shaft power available is closer to 145 Wh/kg of battery while a gas turbine gives 6,545 Wh/kg of fuel: a :1 ratio. For Collins Aerospace, this 1:50 ratio forbids electric propulsion for long-range aircraft. By November 2019, the German Aerospace Center estimated large electric planes could be available by 2040. Large, long-haul aircraft are unlikely to become electric before 2070 or within the 21st century, whilst smaller aircraft can be electrified. As of May 2020, the largest electric airplane was a modified Cessna 208B Caravan.

For the UK's Committee on Climate Change (CCC), huge technology shifts are uncertain, but consultancy Roland Berger points to 80 new electric aircraft programmes in 2016–2018, all-electric for the smaller two-thirds and hybrid for larger aircraft, with forecast commercial service dates in the early 2030s on short-haul routes like London to Paris, with all-electric aircraft not expected before 2045. Berger predicts a 24%  share for aviation by 2050 if fuel efficiency improves by 1% per year and if there are no electric or hybrid aircraft, dropping to 3–6% if 10-year-old aircraft are replaced by electric or hybrid aircraft due to regulatory constraints, starting in 2030, to reach 70% of the 2050 fleet. This would greatly reduce the value of the existing fleet of aircraft, however.
Limits to the supply of battery cells could hamper their aviation adoption, as they compete with other industries like electric vehicles.
Lithium-ion batteries have proven fragile and fire-prone and their capacity deteriorates with age. However, alternatives are being pursued, such as sodium-ion batteries.

Hydrogen-powered aircraft 

In 2020, Airbus unveiled liquid-hydrogen-powered aircraft concepts as zero-emissions airliners, poised for 2035.
Aviation, like industrial processes that cannot be electrified, could use primarily Hydrogen-based fuel. 

A 2020 study by the EU Clean Sky 2 and Fuel Cells and Hydrogen 2 Joint Undertakings found that hydrogen could power aircraft by 2035 for short-range aircraft. A short-range aircraft (< ) with hybrid Fuel cell/Turbines could reduce climate impact by 70-80% for a 20-30% additional cost, a medium-range airliner with H2 turbines could have a 50-60% reduced climate impact for a 30-40% overcost, and a long-range aircraft (> ) also with H2 turbines could reduce climate impact by 40-50% for a 40-50% additional cost. Research and development would be required, in aircraft technology and into hydrogen infrastructure, regulations and certification standards.

Sustainable aviation fuels (SAF)

Electrofuels (e-fuels)
Climate policies could bear the risk of e-fuel uncertain availability, and Hydrogen and e-fuels may be prioritised when direct electrification is inaccessible.

Economic measures

Emissions trading

ICAO has endorsed emissions trading to reduce aviation  emission, guidelines were to be presented to the 2007 ICAO Assembly. Within the European Union, the European Commission has included aviation in the European Union Emissions Trading Scheme operated since 2012, capping airline emissions, providing incentives to lower emissions through more efficient technology or to buy carbon credits from other companies. The Centre for Aviation, Transport and Environment at Manchester Metropolitan University estimates the only way to lower emissions is to put a price on carbon and to use market-based measures like the EU ETS.

Taxation and subsidies 

Financial measures can discourage airline passengers and promote other transportation modes and motivates airlines to improve fuel efficiency. Aviation taxation include:
 air passenger taxes, paid by passengers for environmental reasons, may be variable by distance and include domestic flights;
 departure taxes, paid by passengers leaving the country, sometimes also applies outside aviation;
 jet fuel taxes, paid by airlines for the consumed jet fuel, like the kerosene tax for the European Union or fuel taxes in the United States.
Consumer behavior can be influenced by cutting subsidies for unsustainable aviation and subsidising the development of sustainable alternatives.
By September–October 2019, a carbon tax on flights would be supported by 72% of the EU citizens, in a poll conducted for the European Investment Bank.

Aviation taxation could reflect all its external costs and could be included in an emissions trading scheme.
International aviation emissions escaped international regulation until the ICAO triennial conference in 2016 agreed on the CORSIA offset scheme. 
Due to low or nonexistent taxes on aviation fuel, air travel has a competitive advantage over other transportation modes.

Carbon offsetting 

A carbon offset is a means of compensating aviation emissions by saving enough carbon or absorbing carbon back into plants through photosynthesis (for example, by planting trees through reforestation or afforestation) to balance the carbon emitted by a particular action.

However, carbon credits permanence and additionality can be questionnable. More than 90% of rainforest offset credits certified by Verra's Verified Carbon Standard may not represent genuine carbon reductions.

Consumer option 
Some airlines offer carbon offsets to passengers to cover the emissions created by their flight, invested in green technology such as renewable energy and research into future technology. Airlines offering carbon offsets include British Airways, Continental Airlines, easyJet,; and also Air Canada, Air New Zealand, Delta Air Lines, Emirates Airlines, Gulf Air, Jetstar, Lufthansa, Qantas, United Airlines and Virgin Australia. Consumers can also purchase offsets on the individual market. There are certification standards for these, including the Gold Standard and the Green-e.

National carbon budgets 
In UK, transportation replaced power generation as the largest emissions source. This includes aviation's 4% contribution. This is expected to expand until 2050 and passenger demand may need to be reduced. For the UK Committee on Climate Change (CCC), the UK target of an 80% reduction from 1990 to 2050 was still achievable from 2019, but the committee suggests that the Paris Agreement should tighten its emission targets.
Their position is that emissions in problematic sectors, like aviation, should be offset by greenhouse gas removal, carbon capture and storage and reforestation.
The UK will include international aviation and shipping in their carbon budgets and hopes other countries will too.

Airline offsets 
Some airlines have been carbon-neutral like Costa Rican Nature Air, or claim to be, like Canadian Harbour Air Seaplanes. Long-haul low-cost venture Fly POP aims to be carbon neutral.

In 2019, Air France announced it would offset  emissions on its 450 daily domestic flights, that carry 57,000 passengers, from January 2020, through certified projects.
The company will also offer its customers the option to voluntarily compensate for all their flights and aims to reduce its emissions by 50% per pax/km by 2030, compared to 2005.

Starting in November 2019, UK budget carrier EasyJet decided to offset carbon emissions for all its flights, through investments in atmospheric carbon reduction projects.
It claims to be the first major operator to be carbon neutral, at a cost of £25 million for its 2019–20 financial year.
Its  emissions were 77 g per passenger in its 2018–19 financial year, down from 78.4 g the previous year.

From January 2020, British Airways began offsetting its 75 daily domestic flights emissions through carbon-reduction project investments.
The airline seeks to become carbon neutral by 2050 with fuel-efficient aircraft, sustainable fuels and operational changes.
Passengers flying overseas can offset their flights for £1 to Madrid in economy or £15 to New York in business-class.

US low-cost carrier JetBlue planned to use offsets for its emissions from domestic flights starting in July 2020, the first major US airline to do so. It also plans to use sustainable aviation fuel made from waste by Finnish refiner Neste starting in mid-2020. In August 2020, JetBlue became entirely carbon-neutral for its U.S. domestic flights, using efficiency improvements and carbon offsets. Delta Air Lines pledged to do the same within ten years.

To become carbon neutral by 2050, United Airlines invests to build in the US the largest carbon capture and storage facility through the company 1PointFive, jointly owned by Occidental Petroleum and Rusheen Capital Management, with Carbon Engineering technology, aiming for nearly 10% offsets.

Air traffic management improvements 

An improved air traffic management system, with more direct routes than suboptimal air corridors and optimized cruising altitudes, would allow airlines to reduce their emissions by up to 18%. In the European Union, a Single European Sky has been proposed since 1999 to avoid overlapping airspace restrictions between EU countries and to reduce emissions. By 2007, 12 million tons of  emissions per year were caused by the lack of a Single European Sky. As of September 2020, the Single European Sky has still not been completely achieved, costing 6 billion euros in delays and causing 11.6 million tonnes of excess  emissions.

Operations improvements

 Non- emissions 
 Besides carbon dioxide, aviation produces nitrogen oxides, particulates, unburned hydrocarbons (UHC) and contrails. Flight routes can be optimized: modelling ,  and  effects of transatlantic flights in winter shows westbound flights climate forcing can be lowered by up to 60% and ~25% for jet stream-following eastbound flights, costing 10–15% more due to longer distances and lower altitudes consuming more fuel, but 0.5% costs increase can reduce climate forcing by up to 25%. A 2000 feet (~600 m) lower cruise altitude than the optimal altitude has a % lower radiative forcing, while a 2000 feet higher cruise altitude % higher radiative forcing.

 Nitrogen oxides
 As designers work to reduce  emissions from jet engines, they fell by over 40% between 1997 and 2003. Cruising at a  lower altitude could reduce -caused radiative forcing from 5 mW/m2 to ~3 mW/m2.

 Particulates 
 Modern engines are designed so that no smoke is produced at any point in the flight while particulates and smoke were a problem with early jet engines at high power settings.

 Unburned hydrocarbons (UHC) 
 Produced by incomplete combustion, more unburned hydrocarbons are produced with low compressor pressures and/or relatively low combustor temperatures, they have been eliminated in modern jet engines through improved design and technology, like particulates.

 Contrails 
 Contrail formation would be reduced by lowering the cruise altitude with slightly increased flight times, but this would be limited by airspace capacity, especially in Europe and North America, and increased fuel burn due to lower efficiency at lower altitudes, increasing  emissions by 4%. Contrail radiative forcing could be minimized by schedules: night flights cause 60–80% of the forcing for only 25% of the air traffic, while winter flights contribute half of the forcing for only 22% of the air traffic.

Reducing air travel
Short-haul flight ban
 

Train connections
 Train connections reduce feeder flights. By March 2019, Lufthansa offered connections through Frankfurt with the Deutsche Bahn (AIRail Service) and Air France offered  TGV connections through Paris. In October 2018, Austrian Airlines and the Austrian Federal Railways introduced train connections through Vienna Airport. In March 2019, the Dutch cabinet was working on an Amsterdam connection via NS International or Thalys. By July 2020, Lufthansa and Deutsche Bahn expanded their offer through Frankfurt Airport to 17 major cities.

International conferences
 Most international professional or academic conference attendants travel by plane, conference travel is often regarded as an employee benefit as costs are supported by employers. By 2003, Access Grid technology had hosted several international conferences. The Tyndall Centre has reported means to change common institutional and professional practices.

Flight shame
 In Sweden the concept of "flight shame" or "flygskam" has been cited as a cause of falling air travel. Swedish rail company SJ AB reports that twice as many Swedish people chose to travel by train instead of by air in summer 2019 compared with the previous year. Swedish airports operator Swedavia reported 4% fewer passengers across its 10 airports in 2019 compared to the previous year: a 9% drop for domestic passengers and 2% for international passengers.
The  estimates that 3% of the global population take regular flights.
Stefan Gössling of the Western Norway Research Institute estimates 1% of the world population emits half of commercial aviation's CO2, while close to 90% does not fly in a given year.

In early 2022, the European Investment Bank published the results of its 2021–2022 Climate Survey, showing that 52% of Europeans under 30, 37% of people between 30 and 64 and 25% for people aged 65 and above plan to travel by air for their summer holidays in 2022; and 27% of those under 30, 17% for people aged 30–64 and 12% for people aged 65 and above plan to travel by air to a faraway destination.

 Personal allowances
 Climate change mitigation can be backed by Personal carbon allowances (PCAs) where all adults receive "an equal, tradable carbon allowance that reduces over time in line with national targets." Everyone would have a share of allowed carbon emissions and would need to trade further emissions allowances. An alternative would be rationing everyone’s flights: an "individual cap on air travel, that people can trade with each other".

See also

References

External links 
 Institutional 
 
 
 
 

 Concerns

 Industry
 
 
 

 Research
 
 
 
 
 

 Studies
 
 
 
 

Aviation
 
Aviation
Aviation